Javier Contreras Rodríguez  (born 27 March 1960) is a Mexican former professional tennis player. He now coaches tennis in Texas.

Born in Mexico City, Contreras is the son of former Davis Cup player and team captain "Pancho" Contreras.

Contreras played on the international tour in the 1980s, reaching a best singles ranking of 298. He represented the Mexico Davis Cup team in a 1984 tie against Chile in Santiago, where he lost his reverse singles rubber to Pedro Rebolledo. His best result on tour was a runner-up finish to Tim Wilkison at the 1984 San Luis Potosí Challenger.

His daughter Fernanda Contreras is a professional tennis player.

ATP Challenger finals

Singles: 1 (0–1)

See also
List of Mexico Davis Cup team representatives

References

External links
 
 
 

1960 births
Living people
Mexican male tennis players
Tennis players from Mexico City
20th-century Mexican people